Journal of Molecular Spectroscopy is a peer-reviewed scientific journal that deals with experimental and theoretical articles on all subjects relevant to molecular spectroscopy and its modern applications.

Indexing and abstracting
According to the Journal Citation Reports, the journal has a 2020 impact factor of 1.507. The journal in indexing in the following bibliographic databases:

 AGRICOLA
 Chemical Abstracts
 Current Contents/Physics, Chemical, & Earth Sciences
 Research Alert
 Science Abstracts
 Science Citation Index
 Biological Abstracts
 Scopus

References

External links 
 

Optics journals